Hopewell Centre is a , 64-storey skyscraper at 183 Queen's Road East, in Wan Chai, Hong Kong Island in Hong Kong. The tower is the first circular skyscraper in Hong Kong. It is named after Hong Kong–listed property firm Hopewell Holdings Limited, which constructed the building. Hopewell Holdings Limited's headquarters are in the building and its chief executive officer, Gordon Wu, has his office on the top floor.

Description
Construction started in 1977 and was completed in 1980. Upon completion, Hopewell Centre surpassed Jardine House as Hong Kong's tallest building. It was also the second tallest building in Asia at the time. It kept its title in Hong Kong until 1989, when the Bank of China Tower was completed. The building is now the 20th tallest building in Hong Kong.

The building has a circular floor plan. Although the front entrance is on the 'ground floor', commuters are taken through a set of escalators to the 3rd floor lift lobby. Hopewell Centre stands on the slope of a hill so steep that the building has its back entrance on the 17th floor towards Kennedy Road. There is a circular private swimming pool on the roof of the building built for feng shui reasons.

A revolving restaurant located on the 62nd floor, called "Revolving 66", overlooks other tall buildings below and the harbour. It was originally called Revolving 62, but soon changed its name as locals kept calling it Revolving 66. It completes a 360-degree rotation each hour. Passengers take either office lifts (faster) or the scenic lifts (with a view) to the 56/F, where they transfer to smaller lifts up to the 62/F. The restaurant is now named The Grand Buffet.

The building comprises several groups of lifts. Lobbies are on the 3rd and 17th floor, and are connected to Queen's Road East and Kennedy Road respectively. A mini-skylobby is on the 56th floor and serves as a transfer floor for diners heading to the 60/F and 62/F restaurants. The building's white 'bumps' between the windows have built in window-washer guide rails.

This skyscraper was the filming location for R&B group Dru Hill's music video for "How Deep Is Your Love," directed by Brett Ratner, who also directed the movie Rush Hour, whose soundtrack features the song. The circular private swimming pool is well visible in this music video. This swimming pool has also featured in an Australian television advertisement by one of that country's major gaming companies, Tattersall's Limited, promoting a weekly lottery competition.

Access
 MTR Wan Chai station Exit D, followed by a 5-minute walk south through Lee Tung Avenue.

Gallery

News 
Hopewell shares shoot up 31 per cent after developer unveils HK$21.26 billion privatisation plan

See also
 List of tallest buildings in Hong Kong
 List of buildings and structures in Hong Kong
 List of tallest buildings
 List of buildings

References

External links

 Building's Website
 Dru Hill's music video How Deep Is Your Love at YouTube
 Elevator Layout

Office buildings completed in 1980
Skyscraper office buildings in Hong Kong
Landmarks in Hong Kong
Wan Chai
Buildings and structures with revolving restaurants
Queen's Road East
Hopewell Holdings
Round buildings